Yestonians was a derogatory epithet for historically ethnic Estonians brought from Russia to Estonia after World War II to staff the political structures of Soviet Estonia with cadres loyal to Moscow. While their ethnicity was Estonian by descent, they grew up in the Russian/Soviet environment, which meant that for many, the primary language was Russian (the ethnic Estonian language was a second language), which in turn made them prone to apply Russian-language pronunciation rules on Estonian-language texts that they were to publicly read out in speeches.

The term thus relates to and derides the heavy Russian accent of these people and their practical inability to speak Estonian. To alleviate this, they inevitably read their speeches from paper, and words for Estonians were mispronounced from eestlased to jeestlased [yeestlɑsed], serving as the origin of the epithet. This and the Russian accent were so noticeable, that some high-ranking politicians, such as Karl Vaino, avoided giving speeches in Estonian.

While some of them tried to estonize, such as Ivan Kebin, who renamed himself to Johannes Käbin and notably improved his command of Estonian, most others remained Russian by culture and language.

Accent
Specifically, their application of Russian pronunciation rules and subsequent mispronunciation of the beginning vowel lettered 'E' in Estonian words into "ye" (as in "yes") in place of the plain 'E' (as in "end") — turning Eesti, eestlane (singular) and eestlased (plural) into Jeesti, jeestlane, and jeestlased (Estonian spelling). This also happened with other words beginning with the vowel 'E'.

Party makeup
As Mart Laar wrote, the membership of the Communist Party of Estonia (CPE) in the year 1946 was 52% Russians, 27% local Estonians, and 21% "Yestonians". Moscow was distrustful of local communists (also known as "June Communists"); and by 1952, the upper ranks of CPE had eventually become occupied by Russians and Yestonians. During the Khrushchev Thaw, the number of ethnic Estonians in the CPE gradually increased, especially in lower ranks, but still in 1966, the CPE Central Committee had only about 27% of local Estonians.

Another demographic distinction between native and "Russian" Estonians was age. In hopes of gaining more autonomy within the Soviet Union, many young Estonians joined CPE around the year 1956, while Yestonians were mostly of older generations.

See also
Estonianization
Korenizatsiya

References

Pejorative terms for European people
Estonian culture
Estonian Soviet Socialist Republic
Anti-communist terminology
Social history of Estonia
Estonian dialects
Indigenous politics in Europe
Soviet internal politics
Estonia–Soviet Union relations
Demographics of Estonia